Ardalan Rural District is in Mehraban District of Sarab County, East Azerbaijan province, Iran. At the National Census of 2006, its population was 6,371 in 1,459 households. There were 5,896 inhabitants in 1,628 households at the following census of 2011. At the most recent census of 2016, the population of the rural district was 5,381 in 1,697 households. The largest of its 11 villages was Qeysaraq, with 2,155 people.

References 

Sarab County

Rural Districts of East Azerbaijan Province

Populated places in East Azerbaijan Province

Populated places in Sarab County